Presented below are lists of notable Belarusians of Jewish descent, Jewish people born on the territory of present-day Belarus or of full or partial Belarusian Jewish origin.

Scientists
 Zhores Alferov, physicist, Nobel Prize (2000), born in Viciebsk (Jewish mother)
 Yakov Zel'dovich, physicist
 Lev Vygotsky, psychologist
 Seymour Lubetzky, cataloging theorist
 Semyon Kosberg, Soviet aircraft and rocket engineer, born in Slutsk
 Lera Boroditsky, Cognitive psychologist
 Noam Chomsky, linguist
 Paul Krugman, economist
 Paul B. Sigler, biochemist, parents from Minsk

Mathematicians
 Naum Akhiezer, mathematician, born in Cherykaw
 Issai Schur, German-Israeli mathematician, born in Mahiliou
 Oscar Zariski, Belarusian mathematician

Politicians

United States
Leonard Adleman, Computer Scientist
 David Dubinsky, US labor leader, born in Brest

Canada
 David Lewis (Losz), ex-leader of the NDP

International
 Alexander Parvus, international revolutionary, born in Berezyna

Israel
 Shimon Peres, Israeli prime minister, Nobel Prize winner (1994)
 Chaim Weizmann, first president of Israel, inventor of synthetic acetone, born in Motal
 Menachem Begin, Israeli prime minister, Nobel Prize winner (1978), born in Brest
 Yitzhak Shamir, Israeli prime minister (1984–85 1988–90), born in Ruzhany
 Zerach Warhaftig, born in Vaukavysk
 Berl Katznelson, One of the intellectual founders of the Labor movement in Israel
 Kadish Luz, Israeli speaker of the Knesset, born in Bobruysk
 Yitzhak Rabin, Israeli prime minister, Nobel Prize winner (1994)

Russian Empire and the USSR and Russia 
 Hesya Helfman, Russian revolutionary, member of Narodnaya Volya
 Valeriya Novodvorskaya, liberal Russian politician, Soviet dissident

Belarus
 Viktor Sheiman, adviser to President Alexander Lukashenko, influential Belarusian politician (of partial Jewish descent)
 Mikola Abramchyk, president of the Council of the Belarusian Democratic Republic (of partial Jewish descent)

Writers
 Isaac Dov Berkowitz, Israeli writer
 Źmitrok Biadula, Belarusian poet
 Morris Raphael Cohen, philosopher
 Leon Kobrin
 Lazar Lagin
 Ayn Rand, father born in Brest-Litovsk
 David Pinski, American and Israeli writer, born in Mahiliou
 Ryhor Reles
 Mendele Mocher Sforim, writer
 Carlos Sherman, Belarusian-Uruguayan writer and translator (Jewish father)
 Immanuel Velikovsky, cosmology writer
 Celia Dropkin, American poet (Yiddish)
 Samuel Ornitz, American novelist and screenwriter

Journalists
 Larry King, of Belarusian-Jewish parents
 Eugene Lyons
 Andrew Patner, of Belarusian-Jewish grandparents

Historians
 Simon Dubnow, Jewish historian
 Lazar Gulkowitsch, Jewish Studies scholar
 Avraham Harkavi, historian
 S. Ansky, a scholar who documented Jewish folklore and mystical beliefs, born in Chashniki

Composers and musicians
 Modest Altschuler, cellist, orchestral conductor and composer
 Irving Berlin, American composer
 Arkadi Duchin, Israeli singer-songwriter and musical producer
 Mark Fradkin, Soviet composer

Artists
 Léon Bakst, painter and scene- and costume designer
 Marc Chagall, painter
 Ossip Zadkine, sculptor (Jewish father)
 Michel Kikoine, painter
 Naum Gabo, sculptor
 Antoine Pevsner, sculptor
 Pinchus Kremegne, painter
 Chaïm Soutine, painter
 Mark Rothko, painter
 El Lissitzky, painter ('greater' Belarus)

Businesspeople
 Michael Marks, co-founder of Marks and Spencers
 Louis B. Mayer, co-founder MGM
 Ralph Lauren, fashion designer, son of Belarusian-Jewish emigrants
 Ida Rosenthal, founder of Maidenform Brassieres, born in Minsk
 David Sarnoff, head of RCA
 Ruslan Kogan
 Gary Vaynerchuk
 Sheryl Sandberg, technology executive, her maternal ancestors came from Vidzy
 Jared Kushner, real estate developer, his paternal grandparents came from Navahrudak
 Michael Bloomberg (founder of Bloomberg L.P.), whose maternal grandfather was an immigrant from what is present-day Belarus.

Religious leaders

Rabbis 
 Naftali Zvi Yehuda Berlin, yeshiva dean of Volozhin Yeshiva
 Eliezer Yehuda Finkel, yeshiva dean of Mir Yeshiva (Belarus)
 Shlomo Harkavy, spiritual dean of Grodno Yeshiva
 Yosef Yozel Horowitz, founder and dean of Novardok Yeshiva
 Yisrael Meir Kagan, author, yeshiva dean, and spiritual leader of world-Jewry
 Boruch Ber Leibowitz, yeshiva dean of Kaminetz Yeshiva
 Isser Zalman Meltzer, rabbi and yeshiva in Slutsk and Jerusalem
 Yisroel Yaakov Lubchansky, spiritual dean of Baranovich Yeshiva
 Aaron of Pinsk, rabbi in Pinsk
 Pesach Pruskin, rabbi and yeshiva dean in Kobrin
 David Rappoport, yeshiva dean of Baranovich Yeshiva
 Shimon Shkop, yeshiva dean of the Grodno Yeshiva
 Chaim Soloveitchik, rabbi in Brest
 Joseph Soloveitchik, rabbi and yeshiva dean in Boston and New York
 Yitzchok Zev Soloveitchik, rabbi in Brest
 Yosef Dov Soloveitchik (Beis Halevi), rabbi in Slutsk and Brest
 Chaim Leib Tiktinsky, yeshiva dean of Mir Yeshiva
 Naftoli Trop, yeshiva dean of Radin Yeshiva
 Chaim Volozhin, yeshiva dean of Volozhin Yeshiva
 Yitzchak Volozhin, yeshiva dean of Volozhin Yeshiva
 Elchonon Wasserman, yeshiva dean of Baranovich Yeshiva
 Shabsi Yogel, yeshiva dean in Slonim and Jerusalem

Hasidic rebbes 
 Chaim Chaykl Levin, rebbe of Amdur
 Aharon Perlow (I), rebbe of Karlin
 Aharon Perlow (II), rebbe of Karlin
 Aharon Perlow of Koidanov, rebbe of Koidanov
 Menachem Mendel Schneersohn, rebbe of Chabad
 Elijah Horowitz-Winograd, scion of Nikolsburg dynasty; rabbi in Lida

Sportspeople

 Elena Altshul, draughts player
 Boris Gelfand, chess player
 Yuri Foreman, boxer
 Victor Mikhalevski, chess player
 Anna Smashnova,  tennis player
 Alexandra Zaretsky/Roman Zaretsky, Israeli figure skaters

Military people
 Nahum Eitingon, Soviet spy and NKVD officer
 Tuvia Bielski and Asael Bielski, leaders of a Jewish partisan group (the Bielski partisans) in the World War II
 Yefim Fomin, Political Commissar of 86th Regiment, 6th Rifle Division of the Red Army. Executed without delay by Nazis after being identified as a communist, Jew and commissar upon capture.
 Grigoriy Plaskov, Soviet artillery lieutenant

Other
 Kirk Douglas, of Belarusian Jewish parents
 Jackie Mason, whose parents were Jewish emigrants from Smalyavichy in the Minsk Region
 Lisa Kudrow, her ancestors emigrated from Belarus
 Scarlett Johansson, actress and singer, maternal Jewish grandparents came from Minsk.
 Eliezer Ben-Yehuda, Israeli linguist, father of modern Hebrew language, born in Luzhki near Viciebsk
 Frank Gehry, an architect, his paternal grandmother came from Pinsk
 Harrison Ford, whose maternal grandfathers were Jewish emigrants from Minsk.
 Robert B.G. Horowitz, attorney, whose paternal grandparent were Jewish emigrants from Minsk.
 Sacha Baron Cohen, of Belarusian Jewish grandparents

See also
 List of Jews born in the former Russian Empire
 History of the Jews in Belarus

References

 
Belarus
 
Jews
Belarus
Jews,Belarus